Reuben Perach (29 April 1933 – 1 May 2020) was an Israeli basketball player. He competed in the men's tournament at the 1952 Summer Olympics.

References

External links
 

1933 births
2020 deaths
Israeli men's basketball players
Olympic basketball players of Israel
Basketball players at the 1952 Summer Olympics
Place of birth missing
1954 FIBA World Championship players